This is a list of the horse breeds considered in Russia to be wholly or partly of Russian origin, including breeds from the Russian Federation and from the former Soviet Union. Some may have complex or obscure histories, so inclusion here does not necessarily imply that a breed is predominantly or exclusively Russian.

References

 
Livestock
Lists of Russian domestic animal breeds